Cameraria superimposita is a moth of the family Gracillariidae. It is known from Utah, United States.

The larvae feed on Acer grandidentatum. They mine the leaves of their host plant. The mine has the form of a rather small whitish blotch mine on the upperside of the leaf, with one or two wrinkles in the epidermis at the time of pupation.

References

Cameraria (moth)

Moths of North America
Lepidoptera of the United States
Leaf miners
Taxa named by Annette Frances Braun
Moths described in 1925